Raupp may refer to one of several people:

 Karl Raupp (1837–1918), German Painter
 Manfred G. Raupp (born 1941), German agricultural scientist and economist
 Roger Raupp (born 1963), American artist
 Werner Raupp (born 1955), German theological author
 Wilhelm Raupp, German Painter and Lecturer